Ivan Anatolyevich Vinnikov (born 28 May 1964) is a former Russian professional footballer.

Club career
He made his professional debut in the Soviet Second League in 1988 for FC Torpedo Naberezhnye Chelny. He played 5 games and scored 1 goal in the UEFA Intertoto Cup 1996 for FC KAMAZ-Chally Naberezhnye Chelny.

References

1964 births
People from Tikhoretsky District
Living people
Soviet footballers
Russian footballers
Association football midfielders
Russian Premier League players
FC KAMAZ Naberezhnye Chelny players
Sportspeople from Krasnodar Krai